And Then She Came is a rock band from Aachen, Germany. The band was formed as Krypteria, a gothic metal band. Originating from a 2001 "pop musical theatre studio project" of the same name, the idea was to use different vocalists, though German-Korean singer Ji-In Cho assumed the role of lead vocalist in 2004. One self-titled studio album was released under this moniker (later edited and re-released as Liberatio). The group went on hiatus in 2012 and later reformed as And Then She Came in 2016.

History
In 2001 Chris Siemons and S.C. Kuschnerus worked together to record a fantasy-musical CD. There was no vocalist at that time, because they wanted to record the CD with many different voices. In 2003, the album Krypteria was released. Approximately one year later, in 2004 a tsunami occurred in the Indian Ocean and the German TV station RTL asked them to re-record the song "Liberatio" as a benefit single. Ji-In Cho, was chosen as the lead vocalist for the song and Sony/BMG, decided to re-release an edited version of their first album under the same name.

In 2004, from that project, Krypteria the band was officially born. Although Siemons and Kuschnerus played a leading role in the recording of the album Liberatio, the band does not consider it an official release. A year later their "true" first album, In Medias Res, was released.

Krypteria's second recording was the EP entitled Evolution Principle, released in 2006. A review by the German edition of Metal Hammer marked it as an important release of contemporary gothic metal in Germany.

On January 19, 2007, Krypteria released their second full-length studio album entitled Bloodangel's Cry. The title comes from the track "The Night All Angels Cry"' lyrics.

In early 2008, the band announced that they were working on their third studio album My Fatal Kiss. The album was released first in Germany on August 28, 2009, then in the rest of Europe on January 29.

The band's fourth studio album All Beauty Must Die was released on April 22, 2011 on the band's own label Liberatio Music. Peaking on position 24 in the German Media Control Charts it is Krypteria's most successful release so far.

It was announced in 2012 that the band would be going on hiatus due to Ji-In's pregnancy.

In 2016, the band was reformed and renamed as And Then She Came, with Olli Singer replacing Chris Siemons as guitarist.

Discography

As Krypteria

Studio albums

 denotes an unofficial release

EP
Evolution Principle (2006), Synergy Records

Singles

 denotes an unofficial release

As And Then She Came

Studio albums
And Then She Came (2016), Napalm Records / Universal Music Group, studio album
KAOSYSTEMATIQ (2018), DME Music, studio album

Live albums
Live – Bonsoir at the Abattoir (2016), live album, recorded at a concert on September 30, 2016 at the Abattoir in Aachen, Germany
LIVE MMXVI (2016), videoalbum, recorded at a concert on September 30, 2016 at the Abattoir in Aachen, Germany

Videography

As Krypteria
Liberatio (2005)
Victoriam Speramus (2005)
Somebody Save Me (2007)
Live to Fight Another Day (2011)
Die BVB-Meisterhymne (2011)
Canon Rock (2011)

As And Then She Came
Hellfire Halo (2016)
Public Enemy #1 (2016)
Spit It Out (Rockharz, 2016)
Why So Serious? (2016)
Hellfire Halo (live, 2016)
Who's Gonna Save You? (2017)
Five Billion Lies (featuring Alissa White-Gluz) (2017)
Sick of You (2018)
As the Battle Rages On (2018)
Perfect as You Are (2018)
Come On, Come On (2018)

References
Krypteria at Last.fm
Krypteria.de

External links

Official And Then She Came website
Official Krypteria website
Krypteria at Myspace
Interview with Krypteria (August 2007) – From www.metal-ways.com

Musical groups established in 2001
German power metal musical groups
German symphonic metal musical groups
German gothic metal musical groups
Dark rock groups
Musical quartets
Musical groups from North Rhine-Westphalia